Iran Veterinary Organization is tasked with protecting the health of animals, especially domestic animals. The organization was created in 1925, after World War I, following an outbreak of rinderpest.

Formation
The National Consultative Assembly approved the formation of a veterinary organization in 1925, under the supervision of the Pasteur Institute. Initially, the organization had only 22 employees. The first chairman was Dr. Abdollah Hamedi.

Goals
 To prevent animal diseases
 Vaccine and serum
 A study of plant diseases, insects and diseases of animals
 To produce more useful and domesticated animals
 To increase the number of branches of the agency in Iran

Presidents

References

External links
 Official website 

Veterinary organizations
Agricultural organisations based in Iran
Companies established in 1925
Agriculture companies established in 1925
Agriculture companies of Iran
Veterinary medicine in Iran
|}